Mykola Petrovych Bakay (2 March 1931 – 28 July 1998) was a Ukrainian singer, composer, poet, author and Soviet dissident.

Biography 

Due to the outbreak of World War II he was only able to finish seventh class. In 1947, Bakay together with his family was deported to Siberia. He attempted to escape twice, but was not able to succeed. As punishment he was forcefully settled to work at the logging sites and factories near Omsk. There he studied at the local music school of Vissarion Shebalin and later worked as an actor at the Omsk Theater of Operetta.

Bakay returned from the forced settlement in 1960. He moved to Chernivtsi, where he began singing in the Bukovina ensemble of song and dance. He worked together with many of the performers from the ensemble, but especially with the singer and composer Pavlo Dvorsky. They wrote many songs together, Bakay writing the lyrics and Dvorsky writing the music.

Legacy 

The house of culture in Vynohrad has a theme exhibition that is dedicated to the poet-singer Mykola Bakay. Not far from the building and near the Taras Shevchenko monument the first local festival of the Ukrainian song Smerykova khata took place in 2009 on the day of Illia (Sunday). It was dedicated to the memory of Bakay and his works. The festival opened under the sound of trembitas and a dance performed by the National amateur ensemble of song and dance "Prykarpattia" from the village of Otynia.

References

External links 
 The festival in the memory of Mykola Bakay
 List of songs that Bakay wrote the lyrics for

1931 births
People from Ivano-Frankivsk Oblast
Ukrainian male poets
Ukrainian dissidents
1998 deaths
Ukrainian exiles
Soviet dissidents
20th-century Ukrainian poets
20th-century Ukrainian male singers